The jack snipe or jacksnipe (Lymnocryptes minimus) is a small stocky wader. It is the smallest snipe, and the only member of the genus Lymnocryptes. Features such as its sternum make it quite distinct from other snipes or woodcocks.

Etymology
The common name has been said to come from the Welsh word for a snipe, giach (pronounced with a hard g), but modern dictionaries say it comes from the masculine name Jack. Alfred Newton hypothesized that, "It may be, as in Jackass, an indication of sex, for it is a popular belief that the Jack-Snipe is the male of the common species; or, again, it may refer to the comparatively small size of the bird, as the 'jack' in the game of bowls is the smallest of the balls used, and as fishermen call the smaller Pikes Jacks."

The genus name Lymnocryptes is from  Ancient Greek limne, "marsh" and kruptos, "hidden". The species name  minimus  is from Latin and means "smallest".

Description

Adults are smaller than common snipe and have relatively shorter bill. The body is mottled brown on top and pale underneath. They have a dark stripe through the eye. The wings are pointed and narrow, and yellow back stripes are visible in flight. When seen, the distinctive bobbing movement, as if the bird is on springs, has an almost hypnotic quality.

The head pattern of jack snipe differs from common snipe and other species in the genus Gallinago, in that there is no central crown-stripe; instead, there are two pale lateral crown-stripes, which are separated from the supercilium by an area of dark plumage.

Distribution and habitat
Jack snipes are migratory, spending the non-breeding period in Great Britain, Atlantic and Mediterranean coastal Europe, Africa, and India. The jack snipe is one of the species to which the Agreement on the Conservation of African-Eurasian Migratory Waterbirds (AEWA) applies. Their breeding habitat is marshes, bogs, tundra and wet meadows with short vegetation in northern Europe and northern Russia.

Behaviour

Jack snipe can be secretive in their non-breeding areas and are difficult to observe, being well camouflaged in their habitat. Consequently, birdwatchers have developed a specialised technique for finding them. This involves walking through its marshy habitat until a bird is disturbed and flies up. Jack snipe will squat down and not flush from cover until an intruder is quite close. They then quietly fly a short distance before dropping back into vegetation.

Feeding
They forage in soft mud, probing or picking up food by sight. They mainly eat insects and earthworms, also plant material.

Breeding
The male performs an aerial display during courtship, during which it makes a distinctive sound like a galloping horse. It is silent in winter. They nest in a well-hidden location on the ground, laying 3–4 eggs.

References

External links

 Ageing and sexing (PDF; 0.57 MB) by Javier Blasco-Zumeta & Gerd-Michael Heinze
 Feathers of jack snipe (Lymnocryptes minimus)  at Ornithos.de 
 
 
 
 
 
 
 
 

jack snipe
Wading birds
Birds of Russia
Birds of Scandinavia
Birds of Africa
jack snipe
jack snipe